The 2021 Runnymede Borough Council election was held on 6 May 2021 to elect members of Runnymede Borough Council in England. This was on the same day as other local elections, and was the second election on new electoral boundaries, following the 2019 Runnymede Borough Council election. The elections were postponed from May 2020 due to the COVID-19 pandemic Englefield Green East was not contested.

The Conservatives retained control of the council, increasing their total number of seats by one. Following the election, the party held 26 of the 41 seats on the council, compared with 6 for the Runnymede Independent Residents Group, 5 Independents, 3 Liberal Democrats and 1 seat for the Labour Party.

The political changeover of seats is as follows: Conservative candidate Alex Balkan gained Egham Hythe Ward from the Labour Party, Conservative candidate Bob Bromley gained Addlestone North from the Green Party, independent candidate Carl Mann gained Ottershaw from the Conservative Party.

Results

Ward Results

Addlestone North 

|}

Addlestone South 

|}

Chertsey Riverside

|}

Chertsey St. Ann's 

|}

Egham Hythe

|}

Egham Town

|}

Englefield Green West

|}

Longcross, Lyne and Chertsey South

|}

New Haw

|}

Ottershaw

|}

Thorpe 

|}

Virginia Water

|}

Woodham and Rowtown

|}

References

Runnymede
Runnymede Borough Council elections
Elections postponed due to the COVID-19 pandemic
May 2021 events in the United Kingdom